The Ashton Arcades, also known locally as just Arcades, is a medium-sized shopping centre located in Ashton-under-Lyne, Greater Manchester, England.

It accommodates 40 stores, over two floors, and a multi-storey car park. There are approved plans for the expansion of the centre which will also re-develop the adjacent bus station and add a tram station for the expansion of Manchester Metrolink. The expansion of the centre will cost £40m and add  of retail space which will more than double the current centre.

References

External links
Arcades Shopping Arcades homepage

Shopping centres in Greater Manchester
Buildings and structures in Ashton-under-Lyne